The North Queensland Cowboys have competed for 15 consecutive seasons since their introduction to the ARL (precursor to today's NRL) in 1995.

References

North Queensland Cowboys seasons
 
North Queensland